Japanese pepper is a common name for several plants and may refer to:

Piper kadsura
Zanthoxylum piperitum